The National Military Vehicle Museum, is an automobile museum in Edinburgh, South Australia, established in 1993.

The museum is housed in a group of historic WW2-era buildings within the Defence precinct of Edinburgh Parks and is run by the Military Vehicle Preservation Society of South Australia (MVPSSA). The museum is quite unique in the sense that a large portion of the collection's vehicles are privately owned by the members of the MVPSSA, and the majority of those are maintained in running condition and are regularly used in support of events such as the Anazc Day march, Clipsal 500 and Christmas pageants.

Vehicles range from horse-drawn equipment from WWI through to modern military vehicles. The collection has a special focus on vehicles associated with South Australia's military history and includes vehicles built in Adelaide by General Motors Holden and the Islington Railway Workshops.

Publications
The Olive Drab magazine is a monthly publication published by the MVPSSA, which covers activities of the society and the museum. It is delivered either electronically or via mail to members of the society and to other third-parties.

See also
List of museums in South Australia
List of automobile museums

External links
National Military Vehicle Museum – official site

Automobile museums in Australia
Museums in Adelaide
Military and war museums in Australia